MethaneSAT is a planned American-New Zealand space mission currently scheduled for launch in October 2023. The mission is planned to be an Earth observation satellite that will monitor and study global methane emissions in order to combat climate change. The spacecraft will carry a high performance spectrometer methane sensing system, which will allow the spacecraft to take high resolution measurements of global methane emissions from roughly 50 major regions across Earth.

The mission is jointly funded and operated by the Environmental Defense Fund (EDF), an American non-governmental organization, and the New Zealand Space Agency. It marks New Zealand's first space science mission. The Bezos Earth Fund, founded by Jeff Bezos, announced a US$100 million grant to EDF that will support critical work including completion and launch of MethaneSAT. Dr. Sara Mikaloff-Fletcher, a National Institute of Water and Atmospheric Research (NIWA) carbon cycle expert, has been named as the mission's lead scientist.

History 
The MethaneSAT program was started by MethaneSAT, LLC, a wholly owned subsidiary of the Environmental Defense Fund (EDF), with the goal of providing global high resolution data regarding methane emissions from oil and gas facilities. In January 2020, MethaneSAT announced that the spacecraft will be built using the Blue Canyon Technologies X-SAT satellite bus, with the spacecraft's methane sensing spectrometer being provided by Ball Aerospace & Technologies.

In November 2019, the New Zealand Space Agency (NZSA) joined the program, committing NZ$26 million to the program. Rocket Lab will build and operate the mission control center for the flight in Auckland, New Zealand. NZSA will also take part in launch operations and may contribute to the scientific payload.

Ball Aerospace and Blue Canyon Technologies completed an intensive technology review of their respective contributions to the mission in early 2020.

On 13 January 2021, the nonprofit MethaneSAT LLC announced that it had signed a contract with SpaceX to deliver the 350 kg MethaneSAT into orbit aboard a Falcon 9 Block 5 launch vehicle with a launch window opening on 1 October 2022. Dr. Steven Hamburg, MethaneSAT project co-lead stated: "SpaceX offers the readiness and reliability we need to deliver our instrument into orbit and begin streaming emissions data as soon as possible. We couldn't ask for a more capable launch partner".

References 

2023 in spaceflight
Methane
Earth observation satellites
Satellites of New Zealand